Hongwŏn County is a county in South Hamgyŏng province, North Korea.  It is flanked by the Sea of Japan (East Sea of Korea) to the south, and by the Hamgyŏng Mountains to the north.

Physical features
The northwest region is particularly mountainous. The highest peak is Palbong.  The chief streams are the Tongdaech'ŏn (동대천) and Sŏdaech'ŏn (서대천).  The coastal region is level. The temperature differs greatly from the coastline to the plains to the mountains. The mountains contribute to giving the county a mild climate.

Administrative divisions

Hongwŏn county is divided into 1 ŭp (town), 4 rodongjagu (workers' districts) and 27 ri (villages):

Economy

Agriculture and fishery
The chief local occupation is agriculture. Local crops include rice, soybeans, millet, oats, and potatoes. However, fisheries are also developed, particularly along the coast.

Mining
There is a small amount of mining, exploiting local deposits of gold, silver, limestone, fluorspar, and scaly graphite.

Transport
The county is served by road and rail.  Hongwŏn Station is on the P'yŏngra line of the Korean State Railway.

Notable people from Hongwon County
 Rikidozan (Real Name: Kim Sin-rak; Korean: 김신락), Zainichi Korean professional wrestler

See also
Geography of North Korea
Administrative divisions of North Korea
South Hamgyong

External links

References

Counties of South Hamgyong